The 1987 South American Rugby Championship was the 15th edition of the competition of the leading national Rugby Union teams in South America.

The tournament was played in Santiago and won by Argentina .

Standings 

{| class="wikitable"
|-
!width=165|Team
!width=40|Played
!width=40|Won
!width=40|Drawn
!width=40|Lost
!width=40|For
!width=40|Against
!width=40|Difference
!width=40|Pts
|- bgcolor=#ccffcc align=center
|align=left| 
|3||3||0||0||150||34||+ 116||6
|- align=center
|align=left| 
|3||2||0||1||74||72||+ 2||4
|- align=center
|align=left| 
|3||1||0||2||56||96||- 40||2
|- align=center
|align=left| 
|3||0||0||3||32||110||- 78||0
|}

Results 

First round

Second round

Third Round

Notes

References

1987
1987 rugby union tournaments for national teams
1987 in Argentine rugby union
rugby union
rugby union
rugby union
International rugby union competitions hosted by Chile